Nguyễn Hà Thanh (born 1988), is a Vietnamese artistic gymnast from Ha Noi.

References

1988 births
Living people
Vietnamese male artistic gymnasts
Gymnasts at the 2006 Asian Games
Gymnasts at the 2010 Asian Games
Sportspeople from Hanoi
Southeast Asian Games gold medalists for Vietnam
Southeast Asian Games silver medalists for Vietnam
Southeast Asian Games bronze medalists for Vietnam
Southeast Asian Games medalists in gymnastics
Competitors at the 2005 Southeast Asian Games
Competitors at the 2007 Southeast Asian Games
Competitors at the 2011 Southeast Asian Games
Asian Games competitors for Vietnam
Date of birth missing (living people)
20th-century Vietnamese people
21st-century Vietnamese people